The Penn Wells Hotel in Wellsboro, Pennsylvania, is listed on the National Registry of the Historic Hotels of America.

It was built in 1829 and was expanded and renovated in the 1920s.  It suffered a fire in 1906.

It was once known as Coles House.  "The Penn Wells Hotel sits as the centerpiece of Wellsboro, Pennsylvania's gaslit Main Street historic district."

It is located on Pennsylvania Route 6, which at one time was the Roosevelt Highway, the main route between New York City and Chicago, bringing much business to the hotel.

It is adjacent to the Art Deco Arcadia Theatre (1921), which is owned by the same company that owns the hotel; the hotel and the theater co-sponsor film festivals.

Across the street is Dunham’s Department Store, a local department store. The Dunham family owned the Arcadia Theatre and were instrumental in protecting the Penn Wells Hotel from "extinction".

It is a contributing building in the Wellsboro Historic District, listed on the National Register of Historic Places.

References

Hotels in Pennsylvania
Buildings and structures completed in 1829
Buildings and structures in Tioga County, Pennsylvania
Theatres in Pennsylvania
Historic Hotels of America